The 1981 Louisiana Tech Bulldogs football team was an American football team that represented Louisiana Tech University as a member of the Southland Conference during the 1981 NCAA Division I-A football season. In their second year under head coach Billy Brewer, the team compiled a 4–6–1 record.

Schedule

References

Louisiana Tech
Louisiana Tech Bulldogs football seasons
Louisiana Tech Bulldogs football